Student Connections (SC) is a federally sponsored, Canada-wide initiative that provides E-business and Internet training services to small- and medium-sized businesses as well as senior citizens.

Founded in 1996, the program is funded by Industry Canada and the Canadian government's Youth Employment Strategy and operates out of colleges and universities across the country, giving post-secondary students practical experience working with private-sector businesses to develop effective E-commerce strategies.

There are currently 17 centres in operation across Canada.

External links
 Student Connections Alberta

Economy of Canada
Employment in Canada